Ani Khachikyan (born March 16, 1991, in Yerevan, Armenian SSR) is an Armenian track and field sprinter. She was the national junior record holder for the 100 metres event.

She competed at the 2008 Summer Olympics in the women's 100 metres. Khachikyan placed sixth in her heat without advancing to the second round. She ran the distance in a time of 12.76 seconds.

References

External links

Sports-Reference.com

1991 births
Living people
Armenian female sprinters
Sportspeople from Yerevan
Olympic athletes of Armenia
Athletes (track and field) at the 2008 Summer Olympics
World Athletics Championships athletes for Armenia
Olympic female sprinters